Fang Xiang (born October 1957) is a lieutenant general in the People's Liberation Army of China. He was an alternate member of the 19th Central Committee of the Chinese Communist Party.

Biography
Fang was born in Chun'an County, Zhejiang, in October 1957. He was deputy secretary-general of the Office of the People's Liberation Army General Political Department in 2010 and then head of its Organization Division in 2013. In July 2015, he was promoted to become director of Political Department of the People's Armed Police (PAP), a position he held until December 2015. On 31 December 2015, he was made director of the newly founded Political Department of the People's Liberation Army Rocket Force (PLARF), and served until June 2017, when he was appointed political commissar of the PLA Academy of Military Science.

He was promoted to the rank of major general (shaojiang) in 2010 and lieutenant general (zhongjiang) in August 2016.

References

1957 births
Living people
People from Chun'an County
People's Liberation Army generals from Zhejiang
People's Republic of China politicians from Zhejiang
Chinese Communist Party politicians from Zhejiang
Alternate members of the 19th Central Committee of the Chinese Communist Party